The Cornish Wildlife Management Area is one of 124 New Hampshire State Wildlife Management Areas (WMAs).

History 
The Cornish WMA was purchased in 1972 with Federal Aid in Sport Fish Restoration Act funds to, in this case, provide anglers access to the Connecticut River.  A boat ramp was subsequently built on the property in 1974.  As of May 2013, there were eight agricultural preservation restrictions or conservation easements along New Hampshire Route 12A in Cornish, all of which have been set up by private landowners to protect the farmland for future generations. The Cornish Wildlife Management Area and Saint-Gaudens National Historic Site in Cornish also protect land along Route 12A.

WMAs 
WMAs, in general, are designated for protection and improvement of  habitat wildlife, and for public recreation, including hunting, fishing, trapping (by permit only), and wildlife watching. WMAs are subsidized by the Federal government under the authority of the Dingell–Johnson Act (aka the Federal Aid in Sport Fish Restoration Act), enacted in 1950, authorizing the Secretary of the Interior to provide financial assistance for state fish restoration and management plans and projects.

See also

Other nearby Wildlife Management Areas 

Vermont
 Little Ascutney Wildlife Management Area, Weathersfield and West Windsor – 860 acres and included Little Ascutney Mountain and Pierson's Peak
 Hawks Mountain Wildlife Management Area, Cavendish and Baltimore – 2,183 acres in the southern Green Mountains
 Knapp Brook Wildlife Management Area, Cavendish and  Reading – 1,530 acres
 Arthur Davis Wildlife Management Area, Reading, Vermont, 7,788 acres
 Skitchewaug Wildlife Management Area, Springfield – 216 acres
 Densmore Hill Wildlife Management Area, Hartland – 252 acres
 Plymsbury Wildlife Management Area, Plymouth – 1,859 acres

New Hampshire
 Spaulding Wildlife Management Area, Charlestown, New Hampshire – 54 acres, next to the Hubbard Hill State Forest
 Chase Island Wildlife Management Area, Cornish, New Hampshire – 10 acres on the Connecticut River

Nearby state lands 
 Pillsbury State Park, Goshen, New Hampshire
 Gile State Forest, Springfield, New Hampshire

National Wildlife Refuges in New Hampshire and Vermont 
New Hampshire
 Great Bay National Wildlife Refuge
 John Hay National Wildlife Refuge
 Umbagog National Wildlife Refuge
 Wapack National Wildlife Refuge

Vermont
 Missisquoi National Wildlife Refuge

References 

Protected areas of Sullivan County, New Hampshire
1972 establishments in New Hampshire
Tourist attractions in Sullivan County, New Hampshire
Cornish, New Hampshire